Mariastein Abbey (Kloster Mariastein) is a Benedictine monastery in Metzerlen-Mariastein in the Canton of Solothurn, Switzerland.

Mariastein, after Einsiedeln, is the second most important place of pilgrimage in Switzerland. Over the Chapel of Grace ("Gnadenkapelle") now stands a late Gothic three-aisled basilica. The interior is Baroque and the entrance facade classicist.

History

Mariastein originated as a place of pilgrimage in the late 14th century, with the legend of a miracle of the Blessed Virgin Mary; a stone chapel was first definitely mentioned in 1434. The Augustinian hermits of Basle had charge of the site.

In 1648 Mariastein Abbey was established here with the relocation of the remnants of the failing community at Beinwil, and the foundation of the Benedictine abbey to house them. The abbey was extremely successful both as a revived Benedictine community and as promoters and custodians of the pilgrimage site, which assumed at that period its present importance.

The abbey was secularised twice, in 1792, because of the French Revolution, and in 1874, as a result of a conflict between the state and the Roman Catholic Church known as Kulturkampf, after which the monks were obliged to seek refuge first in France, at Delle, and then, when in 1902 they were expelled as a result of legal changes in France, for a short time at Dürrnberg near Hallein in Austria, and finally in Bregenz, also in Austria. When the monastery at Bregenz was closed down by the Gestapo, the monks returned to Mariastein, where they were granted asylum in 1941. In 1971 the abbey was officially re-established.

The abbey has been a member of the Swiss Congregation, now a part of the Benedictine Confederation, since 1647.

See also
 Beinwil Abbey
 Catholic Church in Switzerland

References

External links 

Homepage of Mariastein Abbey 

Benedictine monasteries in Switzerland
1648 establishments in Europe
17th-century establishments in Switzerland
Religious organizations established in the 1640s
Christian monasteries established in the 17th century
Buildings and structures in the canton of Solothurn
17th-century Roman Catholic church buildings in Switzerland
1971 establishments in Switzerland